Moggie or moggy may refer to:
A mixed breed cat, or a cat of no particular pedigree, for which see:
Domestic short-haired cat
Domestic long-haired cat
Morris Minor, a British automobile which debuted in 1948
Morgan Motor Company automobiles
Moggy Township, Ontario, Canada, wherein lies the source of Percy Creek (Sudbury District)

People

Given name
Leo Moggie (born 1941), Malaysian politician

Nickname
Maurice Hutton (1903–1940), Australian rules footballer
Harold Palin (1916–1990), English rugby league footballer
Gary Colling (born 1950), Australian rules footballer
Jacob Rees-Mogg (born 1969), British politician
Eoin Morgan (born 1986), Irish-born cricketer

See also
Mog (disambiguation)
Moggi, an Italian surname
Moggy Hollow Natural Area, a nature preserve in New Jersey, United States